An octagonal number is a figurate number that represents an octagon. The octagonal number for n is given by the formula 3n2 - 2n, with n > 0. The first few octagonal numbers are

 1, 8, 21, 40, 65, 96, 133, 176, 225, 280, 341, 408, 481, 560, 645, 736, 833, 936 

Octagonal numbers can be formed by placing triangular numbers on the four sides of a square. To put it algebraically, the n-th octagonal number is

The octagonal number for n can also be calculated by adding the square of n to twice the (n - 1)th pronic number.

Octagonal numbers consistently alternate parity.

Octagonal numbers are occasionally referred to as "star numbers," though that term is more commonly used to refer to centered dodecagonal numbers.

Applications in combinatorics
 is the number of partitions of  into 1,2 or 3s. For example: there are  such partitions for :

 [1,1,1,1,1,1,1], [1,1,1,1,1,2], [1,1,1,1,3], [1,1,1,2,2], [1,1,2,3], [1,2,2,2], [1,3,3] and [2,2,3].

Sum of reciprocals
A formula for the sum of the reciprocals of the octagonal numbers is given by

Test for octagonal numbers

Solving the formula for the n-th octagonal number,  for n gives

An arbitrary number x can be checked for octagonality by putting it in this equation. If n is an integer, then x is the n-th octagonal number. If n is not an integer, then x is not octagonal.

See also
 Centered octagonal number

References

Figurate numbers